Heide–Büsum Airport  is an airport serving Heide, a town in the Dithmarschen district in the German state of Schleswig-Holstein.

Facilities

Airlines and destinations

The following airlines offer regular scheduled and charter flights at Heide–Büsum Airport:

See also
 Transport in Germany
 List of airports in Germany

References

External links
 Official website
 
 

Airports in Schleswig-Holstein